The women's discus throw at the 1946 European Athletics Championships was held in Oslo, Norway, at Bislett Stadion on 23 August 1946.

Medalists

Results

Final
23 August

Qualification
23 August

Participation
According to an unofficial count, 9 athletes from 6 countries participated in the event.

 (1)
 (1)
 (3)
 (2)
 (1)
 (1)

References

Discus throw
Discus throw at the European Athletics Championships
Euro